The 23rd Annual D.I.C.E. Awards is the 23rd edition of the D.I.C.E. Awards, an annual awards event that honors the best games in the video game industry. It was also held as part of the Academy's 2020 D.I.C.E. Summit, and was co-hosted by Jessica Chobot of Nerdist News, and Kinda Funny co-founder Greg Miller.

Untitled Goose Game won Game of the Year. Control won the most awards and was tied with Death Stranding for having the most nominations. Sony Interactive Entertainment received the most nominations as a publisher, but Nintendo and 505 Games published the most award winners. Remedy Entertainment won the most awards as a developer.

Connie Booth, vice-president of Sony Interactive Entertainment, received the Hall of Fame Award.

Winners and Nominees
Winners are listed first, highlighted in boldface, and indicated with a double dagger.

Special Awards

Hall of Fame
 Connie Booth

Games with multiple nominations and awards

The following 20 games received multiple nominations:

The following three games received multiple awards:

Companies with multiple nominations

Companies that received multiple nominations as either a developer or a publisher.

Companies that received multiple awards as either a developer or a publisher.

External links

References

2020 awards
2020 awards in the United States
February 2020 events in the United States
2019 in video gaming
D.I.C.E. Award ceremonies